Jason Jennings (born April 18, 1979) is an American professional basketball player. After attending college at Arkansas State University, Jennings was the 43rd pick of the 2002 NBA Draft, selected by the Portland Trail Blazers. He subsequently chose to play professionally in Europe. Jennings is 1 of 9 players selected in the 2002 NBA Draft that never played a game in the NBA.

College career
Jennings began his college career at the University of Arkansas. The 7-foot, 250-pound center blocked 25 shots in his freshman year, scoring a personal-best 17 points against Bethune-Cookman. He started 17 of 31 games in his sophomore season, averaging 4.3 points on 56.7% shooting and 2.7 rebounds per game, and accumulating 36 blocked shots. Jennings scored a season-high 12 points against Mississippi State.

After his sophomore year, Jennings transferred to Arkansas State, where he sat out 1999–2000 season as required by NCAA transfer guidelines.

Playing as a junior, he was named to the Second Team All-District 8 by the National Association of Basketball Coaches. Jennings set a school record with 102 blocks (3.5 blocks per game, good for 8th in the nation). He led his team in scoring, with 13.9 points per game and leading the team in 7 games, and rebounding, with 7.1 rebounds per game and team-best 12 times. Jennings achieved the first triple-double in school history, with 31 points, 10 rebounds and 11 blocks against Morris Brown College.

In his senior season, Jennings averaged 14.6 points, 6.6 rebounds and 3.4 blocks (8th in nation) per game. He totaled 29 points, 13 rebounds and six blocks against Denver. He was selected to the All-Tournament team at the Outrigger Rainbow Classic after averaging 17.0 points, 6.7 rebounds and 5.3 blocks against Georgia, Boston College and Portland.

Career highlights
 Two-time All-Sun Belt Selection
 First player in conference history to post two 100-block seasons
 Scored in double figures in 48 of 59 games at Arkansas State
 Second in school history in blocks (203)
 Sun Belt Conference Defensive Player of the Year (2002)

References

External links
 NBA.com 2002 Draft: player profile
 ESPN Draft Tracker

1979 births
Living people
American expatriate basketball people in China
Arkansas Razorbacks men's basketball players
Arkansas State Red Wolves men's basketball players
Basketball players from Arkansas
Centers (basketball)
People from White County, Arkansas
Portland Trail Blazers draft picks
American men's basketball players